Suet cakes or fat balls are nutritional supplements for wild birds used in bird feeders. They commonly consist of sunflower seeds and wheat or oat flakes mixed with suet, pork fat, or coconut oil. Further blends may also contain nuts, fruits, mealworms and other insects.

Next to balls, which are predominantly common in Northern and Central Europe, suet cakes may take various shapes such as rectangles, rings, or wheels. Fat balls are often sold within a fine plastic net allowing their suspension, such as on branches or in bushes. The nets can however be a danger to other species, such as deer, who may find the balls and eat them whole. Other forms of suet cakes can be placed within suspendable cages.

References

External links
Suet cake recipes on the Baltimore Bird Club website

Bird feeding
Animal fat products